The 1977 Naghan earthquake struck Chaharmahal and Bakhtiari province in Iran on April 6 at 13:36 UTC. More than 2,100 homes were destroyed and 348–366 people were killed.

Tectonic setting
Iran is a region that accommodates oblique convergence through thrust and strike-slip faults with clear geomorphic expression at the surface. These pure thrust and pure strike-slip faults run parallel to each other. Beginning in the Miocene or Cenozoic, continental collision involving the Arabian Plate and Central Iran formed the -long Zagros Mountains. The mountain belt trends northwest–southeast from Eastern Anatolia to the Strait of Hormuz. Approximately 30–50 percent of the ~/yr convergence between the Arabian and Eurasian plates is accommodated along the Zagros.

Earthquake
Major faults in this zone include the Main Zagros Reverse Fault (MZRF) which is an inactive thrust fault bounding the northern Zagros. This fault was active when subduction was ongoing. The fault became inactive when suturing occurred and continental collision began. The Kazerun—Borazjan Fault (KBF) system is another major structure, consisting of a wide zone of right-lateral faults that cuts through the belt. It lies in the middle of the belt. To the east, the Zagros fold and thrust zone accommodates convergence through thrust and strike-slip faulting. Strike-slip faulting is mainly accommodated along the northwest–southeast trending Main Recent Fault which displays right-lateral displacement. The fault is parallel to the MZRF and mountain belt. The KBF fault accommodate the different rate of convergence between the northwestern and southeastern belt. It consists of three segments—the Dena, Kazerun, and Borazjan faults. At its southern extent, these fault segments curve to the east and display reverse faulting. The northern KBF meets the Main Recent Fault (Ardal Fault segment) near Borujen where it also accommodates strike-slip deformation. The MRF also runs parallel to the belt.

Seismicity on the Ardal Fault is high—earthquakes were recorded near the fault in 1666, 1874 and 1880. Along the Dena Fault, earthquakes were recorded in 1934, 1975 and 1989. The earthquake on April 6, 1977 occurred near the Ardal Fault. It displayed a both reverse and strike-slip focal mechanism but no surface ruptures were identified. The fault plane was identified as trending west-northwest–east-southeast. The reverse focal mechanism is inconsistent with rupture on the Dena Fault and suggest it was produced on the Dopolan or the Gazulak faults. These north–northeast dipping reverse faults produce surface expressions further south of the epicenter.

Damage
Destruction occurred over a  area where 384 people and 0.7 percent of the region's livestock perished. A further 200 were injured. The most recorded number of deaths was at Naghan, where 202 died. There were 43 and 64 fatalities at Jaghdan and Ardal, respectively. At Dastgerd, 11 were killed. More than 2,100 homes were destroyed or damaged beyond repair. Eight schools were total losses while another 37 were damaged. The earthquake occurred during a period of heavy rainfall. This furthered the destruction in areas on alluvium with high clay saturation. Landslides occurred on the steem mountain slopes, affecting villages. There was additional damage from the aftershocks.

Adobe brick and masonry buildings made up 90 percent of houses in the region. Most adobe brick houses were razed or damage to the extent that they were unsafe for use. The walls of these homes consisted of adobe-brick and clay mortar, as well as heavy wooden beams and clay which served as roofs. These materials were not resistant to seismic shaking, leading to destruction. Many deaths were associated with these structure collapses. In Jaghdan, all adobe brick homes were lost. Masonry construction were also affected—one school in Ardal was partially destroyed.

See also 
List of earthquakes in 1977
List of earthquakes in Iran

References

External links

Earthquakes in Iran
1977 earthquakes
1977 in Iran
April 1977 events in Asia
Buried rupture earthquakes